2016 Football Division 3 Tournament Northern Region  is the 1st season of the League competition since its establishment in 2016. It is in the fourth tier of the Thai football league system.

Venue Stadium and locations (2016) 
Section 1,2,3 All matches played in Maejo University San Sai District, Chiang Mai
Section 4 All matches played in Chiang Mai University Chiang Mai

Member clubs

Format 
Group stage: A total 13 clubs will be divided into four groups of three clubs except group 4 which has four clubs to play round-robin matches at a neutral venue. The best two clubs of each group will qualify to the knock-out stage.

Knock-out stage: A total of 8 clubs which has qualified from the group stage will play single-elimination stage until there are only two finalists of the tournament.

Result

First round

Group A

Group B

Group C

Group D

Quarter-finals Round

Semi-finals Round

Final round

Winner

See also 
2016 Thai Division 3 Tournament North Eastern Region
2016 Thai Division 3 Tournament Eastern Region
2016 Thai Division 3 Tournament Central Region
2016 Thai Division 3 Tournament Southern Region

References

External links
 http://www.thailandsusu.com/webboard/index.php?topic=375896.0
 https://web.archive.org/web/20160922134240/http://fathailand.org/archives/9792
 https://web.archive.org/web/20161221232904/http://fathailand.org/archives/15489
 http://www.thailandsusu.com/webboard/index.php?topic=378874.0
 ฟุตบอลดิวิชัน 3 ฤดูกาล 2559

Nor
2016 in Thai football leagues